The National Academy of Public Administration (NAPA) is an academy with campuses in Hanoi, Huế and Ho Chi Minh City, Vietnam. The academy provides undergraduate, graduate, and postgraduate education in law, administration, government management for students and public servants in Vietnam.

History
On May 29, 1959, the then-deputy prime minister and minister of interior affairs Phan Kế Toại signed the decree 214-VN to establish the School of Public Administration, the predecessor of today's NAPA. The school was put under the management of Ministry of Interior Affairs and was assigned to provide training for county-level public servants. It was in Phu Luu village, Tan Hong commune, Từ Sơn county, Bắc Ninh Province. The principal was To Quang Dau.

On September 29, 1961, the prime minister signed decree 130-Cp to rename the school Central Public Administration School.

The first training courses given by the school took place from October 16, 1959 to January 16, 1960 in Phu Luu Village Communal House (Bắc Ninh Province) for 216 provincial and county public servants. The teachers for this course were Trường Chinh and Hoang Quoc Viet, among others.

The Central Public Administration School was in an area of 15,000 m2 in Lang Trung Ward, Dong Da District, Hanoi. On May 18, 1961, construction of the school building was started and completed on 25 February 1962. During the Vietnam War, when US army began attacked the North Vietnam, the school was moved to Dong Coi Commune, Thuan Thanh County, Ha Bac Province and kept on training programs here. The training programs were aimed at training for anti-American leaders. In mid-1972, the school only trained invalids.

The school of cadres (for Viet Cong) in South Vietnam was established in May 1974 near Saigon, and the principal was Nguyen Ngoc Sat. After the Fall of Saigon, South Vietnam and North Vietnam were unified. On 30 October 1976, the Vietnamese prime minister signed decree 213-CP to establish a branch of Central Public Administration School in the South at Saigon Academy of Public Administration (this is the campus of NAPA today) on today 3/2 road, District 10, Ho Chi Minh City.

On August 30, 1977, the government signed decree 231/CP to transfer this school from Department of Central Organizing to Office of Prime Minister. The scope of training was training for provincial- and county-level public servants. There were three campuses: one in Hanoi, one in Da Nang, and one Ho Chi Minh City. Each campus would be responsible to provide training in their region (the north, the central, and the south respectively). In fact, only the branches in Hanoi and Ho Chi Minh City are in operation.

On November 1, 1990, it was renamed Central Public Administration School by governmental degree 381/CT. On July 6, 1992, the school was renamed as it is today. Decree No. 253/HDBT of the Council of Ministers defines that the academy is agency under the direct control of the government and is responsible for the delivery of retraining and training for civil servants throughout the country; for the study and research in public administration and administrative reform; and for the expansion of the international cooperation with other institutions in the world in the respect of training for the civil service. On September 19, 2002, the academy was placed under the management of Ministry of Interior Affairs.

Organization
NAPA has its headquarters in Hanoi, a campus in Ho Chi Minh City, and an office in Hué City. NAPA has conducted short-term training courses for the principal and senior corps of civil servants and long-term training at the bachelor's and master's degrees level in public administration.

In addition, as a central training institution, NAPA provides training curricula and materials to 61 provincial Schools of Politics that organize training and retraining for more junior-level civil servants. The training demands are enormous because the current civil service of Vietnam, consisting of approximately 1.4 million, requires improved capacity to manage an economy in transition from a centrally planned mechanism to market economy. In addition, NAPA has recently been designated with pre-service training to prepare labour force for the civil service which will hold training for approximately 140.000 potential civil servants.

Structure
 three functional departments
 11 faculties
 six training sections under the direct supervision of the president
 one research institute of administration
 one journal: State Management Review
 one centre for documentation, library and publication

There are divisions and training sections in functional departments and faculties.

In its campus in Ho Chi Minh City, there are six training sections under the overall supervision of the president and professional guidance of the faculties in Hanoi.

Government of Vietnam
Universities in Hanoi
Universities in Ho Chi Minh City